Bodorgan railway station serves the hamlet of Bodorgan and the village of Bethel on the Isle of Anglesey, Wales. The stop is an unmanned halt, and serves as a request stop for Chester and Holyhead-bound local trains along the North Wales coast.

History

The station, which was originally to be called Trefdraeth, was opened in October 1849 and had a small signal box, a small goods yard and a water tower. The goods yard closed in December 1964 but the stationmaster's house remains (now in private use). There are stone-built shelters on both platforms.

At around 05:00 am on 8 February 2011 an unnamed man was hit by a Holyhead-bound train near the station and died at the scene.

Facilities
The station has the same range of amenities as others on this part of the line (CIS screens, timetable poster boards and a payphone).  No ticketing facilities are available however, so these must be purchased in advance or on the train. Level access is available to both platforms, though platform 2 is only reachable by a barrow crossing and so care is advised when using it.

Services

There is a two-hourly weekday service in each direction from the station. Most eastbound trains run to Wrexham General, Shrewsbury and Birmingham International, although a small number run to either Crewe or Cardiff.

The Sunday service is irregular (six westbound, seven eastbound) and runs mainly to/from Crewe, with one service to Wrexham and Cardiff.

References

Sources

Further reading

External links

Railway stations in Anglesey
DfT Category F2 stations
Former London and North Western Railway stations
Railway stations in Great Britain opened in 1849
Railway stations served by Transport for Wales Rail
Railway request stops in Great Britain
Bodorgan
1849 establishments in Wales
Grade II listed buildings in Anglesey
Grade II listed railway stations in Wales